Alan Gerald Cherry (born 1946) is an African American who in the 1960s joined the Church of Jesus Christ of Latter-day Saints (LDS Church) against opposition. He was inspired by the American civil rights movement.

The LDS Church's priesthood ban restricted Cherry from priesthood ordination upon his baptism into the church, but Cherry sought other ways to serve in the church. When combined with a lively speaking style and some gift as a comedian, this made him a person of some note, mostly in but perhaps outside his local Mormon circles. He was an inspiration to his fellow Mormons, and he was either a curiosity or a disappointment to the people he came from. Cherry once said, paraphrasing: "It's hard to get New Yorkers worked up about things. They take life in stride. They've seen it all. After I found God, I rushed home to share it with my parents. 'Mom, I found the Truth!' 'That's nice, dear. Do you want butter on your peas?'"

Biography
Born and raised in New York City, Cherry as a teenager was in the 1963 March on Washington for Jobs and Freedom during which Martin Luther King Jr. gave his "I Have a Dream" speech. A few years later Cherry acted on a desire for religious freedom as fervent as Dr. King's desire for African-American political and social equality. He joined the LDS Church in 1968 while in the US Air Force. By his own account in several speeches in Provo, Utah, given about 1975, his military status became an obstacle to his religious expression, although it is not to the grand majority of Mormons in the military. Cherry insisted on his own version of the dream: he sought a discharge. His course of action seen as dereliction of duty, he was punished by his superiors. When told the only immediate discharge he could have would be dishonorable, he persisted. The honors of men meant little to him, only the approval of God. After difficulties, they released Cherry to pursue his faith.

In the early 1970s Cherry was part of the Mormon-rock band Sons of Mosiah, which had Orrin Hatch as their manager.

He expressed his religious zeal in part by doing a BA and an MBA at Brigham Young University (BYU), where he was an original member of the Young Ambassadors, a touring performing group. In 1978, after LDS Church President Spencer W. Kimball received divine revelation allowing black Mormon men to receive the Priesthood and act on behalf of God on Earth, Cherry sought and was called on a Mormon mission to Oakland, California. He later served in high local church callings.

In 1985 Jessie Embry hired Cherry to interview black Mormons as part of BYU's LDS African-American Oral History Project. Doing this, Cherry met Janice Barkum, whom he married in the Salt Lake Temple in 1987, and with whom he has had three children. He was still directing this oral history project in 1988 when he spoke at the Charles Redd Center in a meeting on the tenth anniversary of the revelation of the priesthood.

Cherry has had an occasional acting career in LDS produced or oriented movies. He played an IRS agent in Mormon Kieth Merrill's 1981 film Harry's War. He was also cast as a freed slave in the Mormon inspirational film Joseph Smith: Prophet of the Restoration.

Bibliography

 1970: It's You and Me, Lord! My Experience as a Black Mormon (Trilogy Arts)

Discography
 1970: The Sons Of Mosiah : Live In Washington D.C. (Y' Man's Music)

Notes

References

External links
 
bio of Cherry 
Library Thing entry

1946 births
Living people
20th-century Mormon missionaries
African-American male actors
American Latter Day Saint writers
American Mormon missionaries in the United States
Brigham Young University alumni
Converts to Mormonism
Utah Valley University people
African-American Latter Day Saints
Male actors from New York City
American male film actors
African-American missionaries
Latter Day Saints from New York (state)